The United Cut Nail Makers of Great Britain Protection Society was a trade union in the United Kingdom. It merged with the Transport and General Workers' Union in 1952.

See also
 TGWU amalgamations

References

Defunct trade unions of the United Kingdom
Engineering trade unions
Transport and General Workers' Union amalgamations
Trade unions disestablished in 1952